Thomas Pitt (1653–1726) was an English merchant.

Thomas Pitt may also refer to:

 Thomas Pitt, 1st Earl of Londonderry (1668–1729), British politician
 Thomas Pitt of Boconnoc (c. 1705–1761)
 Thomas Pitt, 1st Baron Camelford (1737–1793), British politician and connoisseur of art
 Thomas Pitt, 2nd Baron Camelford (1771–1804), British peer, naval officer and wastrel
 Thomas Pitt (cricketer) (1892–1957), English cricketer for Northamptonshire
 Thomas Pitt (fictional character), the protagonist in a series of detective novels by Anne Perry